Laurie O'Toole (23 October 1937 – 3 December 2013) was  a former Australian rules footballer who played with Richmond in the Victorian Football League (VFL).

Notes

External links 		
		

1937 births
2013 deaths
Australian rules footballers from Victoria (Australia)
Richmond Football Club players